The Chinese New Living Translation (新普及译本 ) is a dynamic equivalent Chinese New Testament translation published in paperback in Hong Kong by Chinese Bible International (汉语圣经协会 Hanyu Shengjing Xiehui) in 2004 and revised in 2006. The base text is the English New Living Translation with comparison with the Greek originals.

See also
New Living Translation
Chinese Bible Translations

References

New Living
2004 books
2004 in Christianity